In probability theory, the van den Berg–Kesten (BK) inequality or van den Berg–Kesten–Reimer (BKR) inequality states that the probability for two random events to both happen, and at the same time one can find "disjoint certificates" to show that they both happen, is at most the product of their individual probabilities. The special case for two monotone events (the notion as used in the FKG inequality) was first proved by van den Berg and Kesten in 1985, who also conjectured that the inequality holds in general, not requiring monotonicity.  later proved this conjecture. The inequality is applied to probability spaces with a product structure, such as in percolation problems.

Statement 
Let  be probability spaces, each of finitely many elements. The inequality applies to spaces of the form , equipped with the product measure, so that each element  is given the probability

Formally,  if there exist subsets  such that:
 
The inequality asserts that:

for every pair of events  and

Examples

Coin tosses 
If  corresponds to tossing a fair coin  times, then each  consists of the two possible outcomes, heads or tails, with equal probability. Consider the event  that there exists 3 consecutive heads, and the event  that there are at least 5 heads in total. Then  would be the following event: there are 3 consecutive heads, and discarding those there are another 5 heads remaining. This event has probability at most  which is to say the probability of getting  in 10 tosses, and getting  in another 10 tosses, independent of each other.

Numerically,   and their disjoint occurrence would imply at least 8 heads, so

Percolation 

In (Bernoulli) bond percolation of a graph, the 's are indexed by edges. Each edge is kept (or "open") with some probability  or otherwise removed (or "closed"), independent of other edges, and one studies questions about the connectivity of the remaining graph, for example the event  that there is a path between two vertices  and  using only open edges.

The inequality can be used to prove a version of the exponential decay phenomenon in the subcritical regime, namely that on the integer lattice graph  for  a suitably defined critical probability, the radius of the connected component containing the origin obeys a distribution with exponentially small tails:

for some constant  depending on  Here  consists of vertices  that satisfies

Extensions

Multiple events 
When there are three or more events, the operator  may not be associative, because given a subset of indices  on which  can be verified, it might not be possible to split  a disjoint union  such that  witnesses  and  witnesses . For example, there exists an event  such that 

whence 

by repeated use of the original BK inequality. This inequality was one factor used to analyse the winner statistics from the Florida Lottery and identify  what Mathematics Magazine referred to as "implausibly lucky" individuals, confirmed later by enforcement investigation that law violations were involved.

Spaces of larger cardinality 
When  is allowed to be infinite, measure theoretic issues arise. For  and  the Lebesgue measure, there are measurable subsets  such that  is non-measurable (so  in the inequality is not defined), but the following theorem still holds:
If  are Lebesgue measurable, then there is some Borel set  such that:
  and

References 

Percolation theory
Probabilistic inequalities